Roberto Palazuelos Badeaux (born January 31, 1967), better known as Roberto Palazuelos or "El Diamante Negro" (The Black Diamond), is a Mexican actor, model and producer; best known for his work in Mexican Novelas.

Origins
Roberto Palazuelos was born to a Mexican father and a mother of French origin. He is an only child with five half-siblings.

Palazuelos was raised by his aunt, noted Mexican chef Susana Palazuelos.

His nickname, El Diamante Negro was bestowed to him by Mexican actor and comedian Omar Chaparro, mixing the name of Palazuelos' hotel 'El Diamante K' and his own appearance of being overtly tanned, "El negro".

Television
Palazuelos has been known in Mexico since the late 1980s for his work in popular telenovelas such as Mi segunda madre and Simplemente María.  His performance as Roger in the successful teen-oriented Muchachitas propelled him to fame.  Dos mujeres, un camino, Amada enemiga, and Salomé are also among his best known works.

In 2003, Palazuelos was one of the participating personalities of: Big Brother Mexico. He also hosted the Mexican Reality TV show: El Bar Provoca, in 2006.

Palazuelos usually plays the bad guy in Mexican soap operas. He was featured as such an antagonist character, in the telenovelas: Mañana Es Para Siempre, Llena de amor, Qué Bonito Amor and Hasta el fin del mundo.

Film
Palazuelos' first professional acting gig, was in 1988, playing the part of: "John", in: Don't Panic

Personal life
Palazuelos was married to Yadira Garza. Cristian Castro sang the opening song at their wedding reception. Another guest, Pablo Montero, sang Ave Maria during the wedding Mass. They have had one child, named: Roberto Palazuelos Jr.

Palazuelos received, both, his Jr. High School and High School certifications and Diploma, when he was already 41 years old. In 2008, Palazuelos went back to college to prepare for a law degree.

Palazuelos owns and runs a B&B, located in Guerrero.  He also owns several world famous hotels in Tulum, Quintana Roo, Mexico.

On October 15 2020 he received a doctorate for his artistic trajectory.

Filmography

Sources
 Biografías Roberto Palazuelos  Esmas.com Retrieved: 2010-05-10.

References

External links

 Official Mini-site

Living people
1967 births
Mexican male television actors
Male actors from Guerrero
People from Acapulco
Mexican people of French descent
Mexican male telenovela actors
20th-century Mexican male actors
21st-century Mexican male actors